Rino Marchesi (born 11 June 1937) is a former Italian football midfielder and manager from San Giuliano Milanese.

Club career
After beginning his career with Fanfulla for a season in 1955, over the course of his playing career, Marchesi played for five Italian club sides, spending the most of his time with Atalanta, Fiorentina and Lazio, winning several titles. He ended his career after two seasons with Prato, in 1973.

International career
While with Fiorentina, Marchesi appeared for the Italy twice, making his international debut in a 4–1 victory over Argentina on 15 June 1961.

Manager career
Following his retirement, Marchesi pursued a career as a manager, coaching several clubs, including Mantova and Ternana, then he guided Avellino to maintain its rank in Serie A in the 1978–79 season, and the following season. He most notably coached Napoli (1980–82; 1983–85), Internazionale (1982–83), Como (1985–86; 1988–89) Juventus (1986–88), and Udinese (1989–91). During his managerial career, he had the opportunity to coach both Diego Maradona while with Napoli, and Michel Platini with Juventus, two of the greatest attacking midfielders of all time; however he also had the misfortune of replacing legendary Juventus coach Giovanni Trapattoni at the conclusion of one of the most successful periods in the club's history, failing to replicate similar success during his two seasons with the club.

As 2022, his last managerial job was at Lecce, but his team was relegated from Serie A in 1994.

Honours

Player
Atalanta
Serie B: 1958–59

Fiorentina
UEFA Cup Winners' Cup: 1960–61 
Coppa Italia: 1960–61, 1965–66
Coppa delle Alpi: 1960–61
Mitropa Cup: 1966

Lazio
Serie B: 1968–69
Coppa delle Alpi: 1971

References

1937 births
Italian footballers
Italian football managers
Association football midfielders
Serie A players
Serie B players
Serie C players
Atalanta B.C. players
ACF Fiorentina players
S.S. Lazio players
A.C. Prato players
Living people
Udinese Calcio managers
Juventus F.C. managers
S.S.C. Napoli managers
Inter Milan managers
Italy international footballers
A.S.D. Fanfulla players